The 1975–76 Liga Femenina de Baloncesto was the 13th edition of the Spanish premier women's basketball championship. Twelve teams took part in the championship and Evax Picadero won its second title. Medina Madrid and CREFF Girona were relegated. Hispano Italiano and Medina Bilbao renounced at the end of the season.

<onlyinclude>

Regular season

Results

References
Hispaligas

External links
Official website

Femenina
Liga Femenina de Baloncesto seasons
Spain
Spain